Cingulina laticingula is a species of sea snail, a marine gastropod mollusk in the family Pyramidellidae, the pyrams and their allies.

Description

The length of the shell varies between 2.6 mm and 4 mm. The whorls of the protoconch are about one-third buried.  The teleoconch contains nine whorls. The small axial bars are a little more pronounced and only four basal keels are present, the first one anterior to the periphery being extremely wide, fully double the width of the next. The aperture also is a little more effuse at the junction of the outer lip and the columella.

Distribution
This marine species occurs off the Philippines and Japan.

References

External links
 

Pyramidellidae
Gastropods described in 1906